The Independent Socialist Faction (Sia'a Sotzialistit Atzma'it) was a political party in Israel in the 1970s.

Background
The party was established on 27 January 1976, during the eighth Knesset, as the Social-Democratic Faction, when Aryeh Eliav and Marcia Freedman left  Ya'ad – Civil Rights Movement. Prior to its creation, Aryeh Eliav had broken away from the Alignment and merged with Ratz to form Ya'ad. On 3 February the new faction was renamed the Independent Socialist Faction.

Prior to the 1977 elections, the party merged with several other small left-wing parties, including Meri, Moked, and some members of the Black Panthers to form the Left Camp of Israel, whilst Freedman created the Women's Party. The Left Camp of Israel won only two seats, which were held in rotation by five party members including Eliav, whilst the Women's Party failed to cross the electoral threshold and subsequently disappeared.

External links
Social-Democratic Faction Knesset website
Independent Socialist Faction Knesset website

1976 establishments in Israel
1977 disestablishments in Israel
Political parties established in 1976
Political parties disestablished in 1977
Socialist parties in Israel
Defunct political parties in Israel